The Chicago Stags were a National Basketball Association team based in Chicago from 1946 to 1950.

History

1946–47 season
In the BAA's inaugural year, the Chicago Stags were placed in the Western Division, and after 60 games were tied with the St. Louis Bombers at 38–22 each. A tiebreaker game between the two teams on March 31, 1947, resulted in the Stags defeating the Bombers in overtime, 73–66, to clinch the division and a first round bye. Under the initial playoff format, the two division champions faced each other in the Semifinals. The Stags defeated the Washington Capitols, the only team to finish with a better record than the Stags, 4–2, and went on to lose to the Philadelphia Warriors in the BAA Finals, 4–1.

1947–48 season
The next season, the Stags finished second in their division with a 28–20 record, one game behind the St. Louis Bombers, and second overall in the league. In the playoffs, they won a tiebreaker game against the Washington Capitols, advancing to play the Boston Celtics in the First Round. The Stags won, moving into the Semifinals for the second consecutive year. However, they were defeated by the eventual champions, the Baltimore Bullets.

1948–49 season
The next year, the Stags finished third, 38–22, seven games behind division-winning Rochester Royals. The playoffs were expanded from six to eight teams, and the Stags played the Minneapolis Lakers in the Division Semifinals where they lost 2–0.

1949–50 season
In their final season, the Stags finished tied for third with the Fort Wayne Zollner Pistons with a 40–28 record, and again lost to the Lakers in the Division Semifinals.

Purchase by Abe Saperstein, name change and folding
Abe Saperstein, owner of the famed Harlem Globetrotters, bought the Stags in June 1950. In August, Saperstein announced that the team would be known as the Chicago Bruins and would play double-headers with his Globetrotters on most of its home dates in Chicago Stadium, something the now-former Stags had already done several times (in fact, the Stags final playoff game was part of a triple-header that also involved the Trotters). The Bruins also planned on playing "home games" in such cities as Detroit, Milwaukee, Peoria, Illinois, St. Louis, Kansas City and Cincinnati, making the Bruins a regional franchise.

However, by September, Saperstein's deal to buy the club fell apart when he withdrew his offer and requested NBA president Maurice Podoloff return his $20,000 deposit, reportedly half of the purchase price. Saperstein claimed he had received "exactly nothing" from the NBA for his money: neither the club nor the contract of four ex-Stags players who jumped to the National Professional Basketball League. (Supposedly, Podoloff, acting on behest of a group of other NBA owners, "foreclosed" on the Stags due to their inability to repay a $40,000 loan that enabled them to finish the 1949-50 season in the first place.) It marked the end of the NBA in Chicago until the Chicago Packers were joined in 1961.

On April 25, 1950, Bob Cousy was drafted by the Tri-Cities Blackhawks but did not sign with the team. Cousy wanted $10,000 and Blackhawks owner Ben Kerner countered with $6,000 in negotiations. Cousy was then sold to the Stags in a trade. When the Stags/Bruins folded, a dispersal draft was held on October 5, 1950 to divide their players throughout the league, with Cousy going to the Boston Celtics.

The Stags were one of seven teams that quickly left the NBA: the Anderson Packers, Sheboygan Red Skins and Waterloo Hawks jumped to the NPBL, while Chicago, Denver and St. Louis folded, shrinking the loop from 17 teams to 11 at the dawn of the 1950–51 season. (The situation got worse in January 1951 as the Washington Capitols folded as well, bringing the number of NBA teams down to ten.)

The NBA would return to Chicago twice, first with the Packers/Zephyrs (now the Washington Wizards) from 1961 to 1963 and since 1966 with the Bulls.

Arena
The Stags played at Chicago Stadium, which was located at 1800 West Madison Street and was demolished in 1995 to make way for the United Center; it later served as the home court of the Bulls from 1966 to 1994.

Notable players
Chuck Gilmur 
Chick Halbert C
Paul Huston
Johnny Jorgensen
Stan Miasek 
Doyle Parrack
Andy Phillip
Gene Rock G
Ken Rollins G (gold medalist in the 1948 Summer Olympics)
Mickey Rottner F
Kenny Sailors
Ben Schadler
Jim Seminoff
Jack Toomay
Gene Vance #12 G
Max Zaslofsky (1947–48 scoring leader of BAA)

Basketball Hall of Famers

Season-by-season records

Aftermath
The Chicago Bulls, the city's current NBA team, wore replicas of the 1946 Stags uniforms during the 2005–06 NBA season as part of the NBA's "Hardwood Classics" program (they wore them on December 5, 2005, February 22, 2006 and April 16, 2006).

References

 
Defunct National Basketball Association teams
Basketball Association of America teams
Basketball teams in Chicago
Basketball teams established in 1946
Basketball teams disestablished in 1950
1946 establishments in Illinois
1950 disestablishments in Illinois